

Results
The following results are the breakdown of votes from each provinces in the Philippines. It will only include the top 15 candidates in each provinces.

Ilocos Norte

Ilocos Sur

La Union

See also
 Philippine Senate election, 2013 regional breakdown

2013 Philippine general election